The Schlossberg, at  above sea level, is a tree-clad hill, and the site of a fortress, in the centre of the city of Graz, Austria. The hill is now a public park and enjoys extensive views of the city. It is the site of several entertainment venues, cafés and restaurants, and is managed by Holding Graz, the city owned utility company.

History 

The fortification of the Schlossberg goes back to at least the 10th century. There are records of a cable-hauled lift being in use between 1528 and 1595 to move construction materials for the fortifications. The castle was never conquered, but it was largely demolished by Napoleonic forces under the Treaty of Schönbrunn of 1809. The clock tower (the Uhrturm) and bell tower (the Glockenturm) were spared after the people of Graz paid a ransom for their preservation.

The remains of the castle were turned into a public park by Ludwig von Welden in 1839. The park contains the Uhrturm, the Glockenturm, a cistern (the Türkenbrunnen) and two bastions from the old castle. The Uhrturm is a recognisable icon for the city, and is unusual in that the clock's hands have opposite roles to the common notion, with the larger one marking hours while the smaller is for minutes. The Glockenturm contains Liesl, the heaviest bell in Graz.

Near the Uhrturm a café with views over the old town can be found. Additionally, on the western side of the Schlossberg, there are two small cafés, one with table service and another with self-service. Next to the terminus of the funicular railway there is a hilltop restaurant with views of western Graz. In what was once the cellar of one of the ruined bastions is the Kasemattenbühne, an open-air stage for concerts and performances.

Below the Schlossberg hill is an extensive system of tunnels, which were created during the second world war to protect the civilian population of Graz from aerial bombing. Some of these tunnels are still accessible, including a passage from Schlossbergplatz to Karmeliterplatz, but many are closed to the public.

Location and accessibility 
The Schlossberg lies in the center of Graz. The mountain is easily accessible by the Schlossberg funicular that carries the passengers from the foot of the mountain (accessible via city-tram line 5) all the way to the top. It is also easily possible to reach the top by walking. A series of steep staircases lead directly to the large clocktower, and a serpentine path on the opposite side of the mountain also leads to the top and ends up in nearly the same place as the stairs.

The summit is also accessible by an elevator. The elevator is accessible through a large tunnel under the mountain located under the steep stairs on Schlossbergplatz.

A tunnel also goes through the Schlossberg parallel to the tunnel connecting the elevator to the outside. This tunnel connects the Schlossbergplatz to Karmeliterplatz.

Entertainment 
Each year the Elevate Festival, a festival for contemporary music, art and political discourse, is held in various venues in and around the Schlossberg.

In the large tunnel connecting the elevator to the Schlossbergplatz, the Fairytale Express Graz can be found. This is a popular grotto railway ride for children.

In February 2017, construction on the largest indoor slide "Sclossbergrutsche Graz" ended. The slide is constructed out of large tubular metal pieces and winds around the elevator. The slide covers a height difference of 64 meters and is 170 metres long. A ride takes approximately 40 seconds and costs up to €7,80.

On the top of the mountain is the Kasemattenbühne, a free air concert venue. It is one of the most popular venue locations in Graz and has a retractable roof so that it can be used when the weather is not good. 1310 people fit in the venue at the same time.

References

External links
 
 Schlossberg page on Graz Tourism web site
 Schlossberg page on Holding Graz web site

Schlossberg
Castles in Styria
Landforms of Styria
Clock towers
Hills of Austria
Schlossberg
Schlossberg
Graz Highlands